XZ Tauri is a binary system approximately  away in the constellation Taurus. The system consists of two T Tauri stars orbiting each other about 6 billion kilometers apart (roughly the same distance as Pluto is from the Sun).  The system made news in 2000 when a superflare was observed in the system.

Gallery

Notes

References

External links 
 
 XZ Tauri at Constellation Guide 

Binary stars
T Tauri stars
Taurus (constellation)
Tauri, XZ